Canela is a dialect of the Canela-Krahô language, a Timbira variety of the Northern Jê language group (Jê, Macro-Jê) spoken by the Apànjêkra (Apaniêkrá) and by the Mẽmõrtũmre (Ràmkôkãmẽkra, Ramkokamekrá) in Maranhão, Brazil.

Phonology

Vowels

Consonants 

 Stop sounds /p, t, k/ can be heard as voiced [b, d, ɡ] in syllable-initial position within unstressed syllables, following voicing and in syllable-final position following voicing.
 A velar nasal /ŋ/ can fluctuate in free variation with a prenasalized and voiced plosive [ŋɡ~ɡ] between dialects.
 /t͡s/ is recognized as a post-alveolar /t͡ʃ/ among dialectal differences.
 /n, m/ can be heard as prestopped [ᵈn, ᵇm] when after oral vowels.
 /v/ is only heard in syllable-initial position, elsewhere it is pronounced as [w].
 /j/ is heard as [z] when in final position of consonant clusters and in initial position within stressed syllables, and is nasalized as [z̃] before nasal vowels. It is heard as [j] elsewhere in syllable-final and unstressed syllable-initial positions.
 /l/ is heard as a lateral flap [ɺ] when in intervocalic positions, or following consonants.
 /h/ is heard as a glottal stop [ʔ] in syllable-final position when preceding consonants, and as a velar [x] before high-oral vowels.

Morphology

Finiteness morphology
In Canela, like in all Northern Jê languages, verbs inflect for finiteness and thus have a basic opposition between a finite form and a nonfinite form. Finite forms are used in matrix clauses only, whereas nonfinite forms are used in all types of subordinate clauses as well as in some matrix clauses (such as recent past clauses and any clauses which contain modal, aspectual, or polar operators). Nonfinite forms are most often formed via suffixation and/or prefix substitution. Some verbs (including all descriptives with the exception of cato 'to exit', whose nonfinite form is cator) lack an overt finiteness distinction.

The following nonfinite suffixes have been attested: -r (the most common option, found in many transitive and intransitive verbs), -n (found in some transitive verbs), as well as -c and -m (found in a handful of intransitive verbs which take a nominative subject when finite).

In Proto-Northern Jê, a handful of verbs, all of which ended in an underlying stop, formed their finite form by means of leniting the stem-final consonant (*-t, *-c, *-k → *-r, *-j, *-r); in turn, the nonfinite form received no overt marking. At least three verbs still follow this pattern in Canela.

Syntax
Canela is a head-final language.

Morphosyntactic alignment
Different main clause constructions present different combinations of alignment patterns, including split-S (default), ergative–absolutive (recent past), and nominative–absolutive (evaluative, progressive, continuous, completive, and negated clauses). In contrast, subordinate clauses are always ergative–absolutive.

Prototypically, finite matrix clauses in Canela have a split-S alignment pattern, whereby the agents of transitive verbs (A) and the sole arguments of a subclass of intransitive verbs (SA) receive the nominative case (also called agentive case), whereas the patients of transitive verbs (P) and the sole arguments of the remaining intransitive predicates (SP) receive the absolutive case (also called internal case). In addition, transitive verbs are subdivided into two classes according to whether the third person patient is indexed as absolutive (allomorphs h-, ih-, im-, in-, i-, ∅-) or accusative (cu-), which has been described as an instance of a split-P alignment. There are only several dozen of transitive verbs which take an accusative patient, all of which are monosyllabic and have distinct finite and nonfinite forms. It has been suggested that all transitive verbs which satisfy both conditions (monosyllabicity and a formal finiteness distinction), and only them, select for accusative patients, while all remaining transitive verbs take absolutive patients in Canela and all other Northern Jê languages.

All subordinate clauses as well as recent past clauses (which are historically derived from subordinate clauses and are headed by a nonfinite verb) are ergatively organized: the agents of transitive verbs (A) are encoded by ergative postpositional phrases, whereas the patients of transitive verbs (P) and the sole arguments of all intransitive predicates (S) receive the absolutive case (also called internal case).

Evaluative, progressive, continuous, completive, and negated clauses (which are historically derived from former biclausal constructions with an ergatively organized subordinate clause and a split-S matrix clause) in Canela have the cross-linguistically rare nominative-absolutive alignment pattern. An example of this alignment type in negated clauses is given below.

In nominative–absolutive clauses, the sole argument of an intransitive verb (S) is aligned with the agent argument of a transitive verb (A) in that both may be expressed by nominative pronouns, such as wa 'I.NOM' or ca 'you.NOM' (nouns do not take case inflection in Canela), which occupy the same position in a phrase (in the example above, both precede the irrealis marker ha). At the same time, the sole argument of an intransitive verb (S) is aligned with the patient argument ('direct object') of a transitive verb (P) in that both may be indexed on the verb by person prefixes of the absolutive series ( such as i- 'I.ABS' or a- 'you.ABS'). There are no elements which pattern as ergative or accusative in this type of clauses in Canela.

The historical origin of the nominative–absolutive clauses in Canela has been shown to be a reanalysis of former biclausal constructions (a split-S matrix clause, headed by the auxiliary, and an ergative–absolutive embedded clause, headed by the lexical verb) as monoclausal, with the loss of the ergative.

Classes of predicates
The following table summarizes the proposed classes of predicates in Canela.
{| class="wikitable"
! argument structure in finite clauses !! type !! examples
|-
| ANOM PACC || transitive verb (cu-class) || krẽ 'to eat' (singular)'
|-
| ANOM PABS || transitive verb (default) || -hhôc 'to paint'
|-
| SNOM || (active) intransitive verb || tẽ 'to go fast'
|-
| SABS || descriptive || -ncryc 'to be angry'
|-
| ExpDAT || monovalent verbum sentiendi || prãm 'to be hungry'
|-
| ExpDAT StimulusABS || bivalent verbum sentiendi || -hkĩn 'to like'
|}

Transitive verbs
In Canela, transitive verbs take accusative or absolutive patients in finite clauses, depending on the verb class. In nonfinite clauses, all transitive verbs take absolutive patients. Note that nouns do not receive any overt marking either in the accusative or in the absolutive case; the difference between these two cases is seen in the third person index, whose form is cu- in the accusative case and h- (allomorphs ih-, im-, in-, i-, ∅-) in the absolutive case.

The transitive verbs which index their patient in the accusative case (in finite clauses) are known as cu-verbs. All cu-verbs are monosyllabic and have distinct finite and nonfinite forms. The remaining transitive verbs index their patient in the absolutive case. All verbs that belong to this class satisfy at least one of the following conditions:
they contain at least two syllables (for example, pupu 'to see', cahô 'to suck, to eat fruits', -hcuhhõ 'to wash (body, hands)'),
their finite and nonfinite forms are identical (for example, -hhôc 'to paint', -hkre 'to plant', -hpro 'to cover, to catch, to rape').

Finite cu- verbs further differ from all other transitive verbs in that under certain circumstances they index their agent (rather than patient) on the verb. This happens when a second-person agent acts over a third-person patient.

Canonical (active) intransitive verbs

Descriptives
Intransitive predicates which take absolutive (rather than nominative) subjects are known as descriptives.

Verba sentiendi and dative subjectsVerba sentiendi take dative subjects in Canela

Monovalent verba sentiendi take only one argument (experiencer), which is encoded by a dative postpositional phrase.

Bivalent verba sentiendi'' take two arguments. The experiencer is encoded by a dative postpositional phrase, and the theme receives the absolutive case.

References

External links
Translation of Genesis into Canela
Canela (Intercontinental Dictionary Series)

Jê languages
Languages of Brazil